Gladiatrix (Robin Braxton) is a fictional superhero appearing in American comic books published by Marvel Comics, first introduced in 1986. She was created by Mike Carlin and Ron Wilson as a super strong professional wrestler and supervillain as part of the Grapplers. She later appeared in Captain America and featured in Civil War siding with the anti-registration faction.

Publication history
Gladiatrix first appeared in The Thing  #33 (March 1986), and was created by Mike Carlin and Ron Wilson. She later appeared in several issues of the first Captain America volume, first in issue 352, and later as part of the Superia Strategem. She was included as an "Anti-Registration" character in the 2006–07 crossover storyline Civil War.<ref>Civil War: Front Line #4</ref> The Grapplers received an entry in the appendix of the first volume of The Official Handbook of the Marvel Universe, and a full team entry in volume two with a section for Gladiatrix.

Fictional character biography
Becoming a professional wrestler shortly after her youth, Robin Braxton has been fighting for her life ever since. She gained her current enhanced strength through an augmentation given by Power Broker INC. Shortly afterward she abandoned her life as a wrestler and became part of The Grapplers.

They were forced to restrain Titania, who had just lost a battle from Battleaxe. When the Grapplers came face to face with the Thing, Gladiatrix decided to remain on the good side and helped him out, saving the day. Later, Gladiatrix tried out for membership in the Avengers, but was denied after she almost got into a battle with Ursa Major.

She agreed to join Superia's Femizons afterward, becoming a supervillain once more. She was attacked by Captain America and Paladin, whom Gladiatrix manages to capture. The heroes eventually rescued themselves and defeated Gladiatrix afterwards. She would later be seen attending the  A.I.M. Weapons Expo on an island protected by international law.

Civil War

However, during the Civil War event, Gladiatrix chose the side of the heroes once more and became involved with a gang that was strongly against the Super-Hero Registration Act. Her allies include, but are not limited to, Solo, Typeface and Battlestar. She is apprehended when a S.H.I.E.L.D. squad enters their hideout. She almost escapes, being responsible for the visiting journalist Sally Floyd. Debris knocks her down and Sally escapes on her own.  She is later seen in the Negative Zone Prison, being contained in some virtual reality apparatus, begging for someone to help her. She, along with the other captive heroes were freed by Hulkling. The people he freed assisted Captain America in their fight against the Pro-Registration forces. She did not accept the offer of amnesty.

Powers and abilities
Gladiatrix has a degree of super-human strength, durability and stamina. She is a skilled wrestler and formidable in hand-to-hand combat.

Alternate versions
A version of Gladiatrix appeared in World War Hulk'': Front Line issue 4, depicting an alternate reality of the World War Hulk storyline. The world was identified as "Earth-71143" in the Marvel Comics Multiverse.

References

External links

Characters created by Mike Carlin
Characters created by Ron Wilson
Comics characters introduced in 1986
Fictional characters with superhuman durability or invulnerability
Fictional mercenaries in comics
Fictional professional wrestlers
Fictional women soldiers and warriors
Marvel Comics characters with superhuman strength
Marvel Comics female superheroes
Marvel Comics female supervillains
Marvel Comics martial artists
Marvel Comics mutates